The EAGLE is a grenade launcher of Canadian origin. The weapon is chambered in the 40mm round and is a grenade launcher attachment. A MIL-STD rail is required for attachment it can be used on the C7/M16, C8/M4 series rifles/carbines. It can be used as a stand-alone weapon.

See also
 M203 grenade launcher
 M79 grenade launcher
 HK69 grenade launcher
 B&T GL-06 Grenade Launcher
 Fort-600 grenade launcher
 RGM-40 grenade launcher

References

External links 
 EAGLE grenade launcher on Colt Canada's website

40×46mm grenade launchers
Weapons of Canada